Josef Jabor (1898–?) was a Czechoslovak coxswain. He competed at the 1936 Summer Olympics in Berlin with the men's coxed four where they were eliminated in the semi-final.

References

1898 births
Year of death unknown
Czechoslovak male rowers
Olympic rowers of Czechoslovakia
Rowers at the 1936 Summer Olympics
Coxswains (rowing)
European Rowing Championships medalists